3345 Tarkovskij, provisional designation , is a carbonaceous background asteroid from the inner regions of the asteroid belt, approximately  in diameter. It was discovered on 23 December 1982, by Russian astronomer Lyudmila Karachkina at the Crimean Astrophysical Observatory in Nauchnyj, on the Crimean peninsula, and named after filmmaker Andrei Tarkovsky. The C-type asteroid is a slow rotator with a rotation period of 187 hours.

Orbit and classification 
Tarkovskij is a non-family asteroid from the main belt's background population. It orbits the Sun in the inner main-belt at a distance of 2.0–2.9 AU once every 3 years and 11 months (1,420 days). Its orbit has an eccentricity of 0.19 and an inclination of 16° with respect to the ecliptic.

Naming 
This minor planet named after the Soviet theater director and film-maker Andrei Tarkovsky (1932—1986). The approved naming citation was published by the Minor Planet Center on 31 May 1988.

Physical characteristics 
In the SMASS classification, Tarkovskij is a carbonaceous C-type asteroid, unusual for inner-belt asteroids which are typically of a stony composition.

Slow rotator 
In January 2014, a rotational lightcurve of Tarkovskij was obtained from photometric observations taken at the Belgrade Observatory and the CS3 DanHenge Observatory . Lightcurve analysis gave a rotation period of 187 hours with a brightness variation of 0.59 magnitude. This makes it a slow rotator, as most asteroids have periods shorter than 20 hours.

Diameter and albedo 

According to the surveys carried out by the Infrared Astronomical Satellite IRAS, the Japanese Akari satellite, and NASA's Wide-field Infrared Survey Explorer with its subsequent NEOWISE mission, Tarkovskij measures between 21.02 and 24.17 kilometers in diameter and its surface has an albedo between 0.0407 and 0.096. The Collaborative Asteroid Lightcurve Link derives an albedo of 0.0526 and adopts a diameter of 24.17 kilometers with on an absolute magnitude of 11.9 from the IRAS results.

References

External links 
 3345 Tarkovskij occults TYC
 Asteroid Lightcurve Database (LCDB), query form (info )
 Dictionary of Minor Planet Names, Google books
 Asteroids and comets rotation curves, CdR – Observatoire de Genève, Raoul Behrend
 Discovery Circumstances: Numbered Minor Planets (1)-(5000) – Minor Planet Center
 
 

003345
Discoveries by Lyudmila Karachkina
Named minor planets
3345 Tarkovskij
003345
003345
19821223